Asian Highway 32 or AH32 is a route running  from Sonbong in North Korea to Khovd in Mongolia via China. The partial route in China is considered as potential Asian highway as per map.

North Korea 
Sonbong – Wonjong - China border : .

China
: Quanhe - Hunchun
: Hunchun - Changchun - Ulanhot (SE.)
Ulanhot SW. Ring Expressway: Southern Ulanhot
: Ulanhot (SW.) - Haerbagang Tuowula
: Haerbagang Tuowula - Arxan
: Arxan - Arxan Port

Mongolia
Sümber – Choibalsan – Öndörkhaan – Nalayh – Ulaanbaatar – Uliastay – Khovd : .

Junctions
North Korea
  Sonbong
China
  Changchun
Mongolia
  Ulaanbaatar
  Khovd

See also
 List of Asian Highways
 International E-road network
 Trans-African Highway network

References

External links
  Treaty on Asian Highways with routes

Asian Highway Network
Roads in North Korea
Roads in China
Roads in Mongolia